was released by Ringo Sheena, Neko Saito and Junpei Shiina on January 17, 2007 in the name of . It was certified gold by the RIAJ for 100,000 copies shipped to stores in 2007.

Background 
The song was used as theme song for the movie Sakuran, of which Sheena was the music director. The song is a duet with her brother Shiina Junpei, and is shown using the ending of the film. This is the first solo work by Sheena for two months, after the digital single "Karisome Otome (Death Jazz Ver.)" was released, and her first physical single in three years since she released "Ringo no Uta" at the end of 2003. Kiyoshi Hasegawa whom Shiina had respected for a long time played "Sakuran (ONKIO ver.)" on the acoustic guitar.

Track listing

Chart rankings

Sales and certifications

Notes 

Ringo Sheena songs
2007 singles
2007 songs
Songs written by Ringo Sheena
Macaronic songs
Japanese film songs